The Franco-Belgian Military Accord of 1920 was a collective defense pact signed between France and Belgium in September 1920. The Accord was cancelled in 1936 as Belgium returned to pursuing a policy of neutrality, which it would continue until the Second World War.

Background
After experiencing a German invasion in the First World War, the Belgian government was anxious to secure a defensive treaty against a possible resurgent Germany in the future.  However, the government were anxious that Belgium should not become a mere protectorate of France and was reluctant to risk being dragged into a war by an ally attempting to enforce terms of the 1919 Treaty of Versailles. On the other hand, the French wanted Belgian involvement in the League of Nations' 15-year occupation of the Rhineland and were keen to gain Belgian military support in event of war.

Agreement

The pact was negotiated in April 1920 and signed on 7 September. Ferdinand Foch was the chief negotiator for the French, though he failed to gain a union of French and Belgian armies and agreements over mobilization which he sought. Though British participation was requested, it was rejected by the government.

Terms
The first article outlined an agreement including both French and Belgian soldiers in the occupation of the Rhineland. It also stated, that in the event of German rearmament, both countries would mobilise their reserves. The second article discussed greater integration of frontier defenses, while the third article announced greater co-operation between General Staffs.

End of the treaty
The treaty was formally abrogated in 1936 and Belgium returned to pursuing a policy of neutrality. The Belgian government preferred to construct fortifications, and gain assurances of neutrality from surrounding countries, including Nazi Germany, than risk getting entangled in another war through an alliance structure.

Perception
The agreement was initially met with general approval in Belgium.  However support for the pact was split down regional lines with the Walloon population favoring closer military ties with France unlike the Flemish population which was opposed what they perceived as rising French influence in the country.

Most modern historians regard the treaty, together with other French military alliances of the period, as failures, because they failed to create a strong alliance network that was capable of preventing the projection of German power in the late 1930s.

References

Further reading

Belgium–France relations
Treaties concluded in 1920
Treaties concluded in 1936
Treaties of the French Third Republic
Treaties of Belgium
1920 in Belgium
1920 in France
Belgian neutrality in World War II
Interwar-period treaties